Medtral is a New Zealand based medical travel company that provides private medical care to overseas patients. All surgical procedures undertaken by Medtral are performed by English speaking surgeons and physicians all of whom have received their training both in New Zealand and either North America or Europe and are performed in internationally accredited hospitals. Each Medtral patient is assigned a ‘lead medical carer’- who co-ordinates all aspects of the patient’s medical care.

The process followed by Medtral adheres to the guidelines set out by the American Medical Association (AMA) and American College of Surgeons (ACS) for medical tourism.

Destination
As a destination, New Zealand is considered a safe, first world English speaking country with a cultural and medical affinity with North America located 12 hours by direct flight from the major ports on the West Coast of the United States.

Procedures offered

Orthopedic surgery (including hip replacement and knee replacement surgery).
Cardiac surgery such as Coronary artery bypass surgery (CABG) and valve replacement surgery. 
General surgery is also available including Gall bladder removal (Cholecystectomy), liver resection and renal transplant. Bladder and prostate surgery is available including robotic prostatectomies.
Gynecological surgery is also available.

History
Medtral was founded by Edward Watson in July 2007 as the international marketing arm of a private hospital network in New Zealand.

Accreditations and affiliations
Accredited by Quality Health New Zealand (QHNZ). QHNZ is similar to JCI (Joint Commission, formerly the Joint Commission on Accreditation of Healthcare Organizations (JCAHO)) and is a member of International Society for Quality in Healthcare or ISQUA.
Are a member of the Medical Tourism Association.

Hospitals
Mercy Hospital.
Ascot Hospital.

See also
List of hospitals in New Zealand
International healthcare accreditation
Medical tourism

References

External links
Official website of the American Medical Association
Official website of the American College of Surgeons 
Official website of Mercy Hospital
Official website of the Joint Commission

Medical tourism
Health care companies of New Zealand